Morecambe Promenade Station was a railway station in Morecambe, Lancashire, England. It was opened on 24 March 1907 by the Midland Railway and closed in February 1994. After twelve weeks break in passenger service for the revision of track work and signalling a new Morecambe station was opened on a site closer to the town centre.

It was named Morecambe both before and after being named Morecambe Promenade.

History 
Built by the Midland Railway Company as the terminus of the former "little" North Western Railway, Morecambe Promenade Station first opened to passengers in 1907. It served as a replacement for the inadequate Northumberland Street Station (which was ironically situated on the site of the new two-platform Morecambe station).

The Promenade station was built to cater for a large influx of passengers. To this effect, the station comprised four main platforms and a goods siding. When the station opened, there was some controversy over the segregation of passengers into 1st and 2nd class waiting rooms. Many passengers disapproved of this and chose to wait instead in the station concourse. The Midland Railway sought to exploit the potential of moving holidaymakers between Morecambe, Heysham and Lancaster and to provide a speedy and efficient service for workers at the then state-of-the-art 1905 port. The station was therefore constructed opposite the old Midland Hotel, enabling tourists arriving overnight by rail to stay in the hotel before taking the boat to the Isle of Man and Barrow from the Stone Jetty. Passengers using the facilities came from Leeds and Bradford as well as the West Coast of Scotland.

The electrical power for the overhead lines was supplied from the company's power station at Heysham Harbour. Three new 3-car electric multiple units were purpose-built by the Midland at Derby to operate the service, which ran every 30 minutes throughout the day between the main LNWR station at  Castle and Heysham with reversals en route here and at Lancaster Green Ayre. The new trains proved to be popular with the public and also very reliable (with an availability rate of over 99% in the first 15 months of operation). These were maintained at the station.

With a fast and frequent electric local service and regular links to and from the West Riding of Yorkshire, it was no surprise that the station soon became very busy (especially in the summer), handling significantly more traffic than the rival LNWR station at nearby . This tendency continued after World War I and the 1923 Grouping, when both lines into the resort came under the ownership of the London, Midland and Scottish Railway. The volume of summer traffic to the resort was such though (thanks to the LMS company's continued promotion of Morecambe as a holiday destination) that Promenade was not able to handle all the traffic on offer and many trains still had to use Euston Road.

Postwar
Nationalisation of the UK railway network in 1948 saw British Railways take over control of the station and heralded an era of significant changes. The first of these came in February 1951, when the EMU sets were withdrawn and scrapped, after more than 40 years of service. Steam push-pull sets replaced them, but in 1953 electric working was reinstated, still at 6600 V AC and using the same infrastructure, but this time at a 50 Hz frequency. Another notable change occurred in September 1958, when the former LNWR terminus at Euston Road was closed to regular passenger traffic at the end of the summer timetable. The local services from Lancaster and Carnforth via  henceforth followed the same route as the Irish Boat trains into Promenade, leaving Euston Road to be served only during the peak summer season between June and September until 1962. Summer traffic was by this time slowly declining (due to the rise in private car ownership and increasing availability of foreign package holidays), but there were still sufficient numbers visiting Morecambe in 1959 to require more than 20 scheduled and excursion trains to and from Euston Road and a similar number from Promenade.

By 1963 though, Euston Road closed completely and all services had been permanently diverted to Promenade station and the future was looking increasingly uncertain following the publication of the Beeching Report.  The report's author, Richard Beeching - the Chairman of the British Transport Commission - treated branch lines as irrelevant to the overall operation of intercity rail networks, believing that car owners would drive to and park at mainline stations before taking the train. One of the recommendations of his report was that service provision to Morecambe needed to be "modified", with one of the two routes eastwards closed and the remaining traffic concentrated on the other. Initially this was expected to be the ex-Midland line, but in the spring of 1964, it was announced that the former LNWR branch would be the one to be kept, even though the ex-Midland route was electrified and more heavily used.  As part of these plans, Promenade would be retained (at least in the short term) along with the branch to Heysham, but the former main line to Green Ayre and on to Wennington would be abandoned.  The Leeds trains were to be re-routed via Carnforth and Hest Bank, and the existing DMU local service to Lancaster via Bare Lane would see an increase in frequency to compensate. The following year BR proposed to build a new south-to-east curve at Torrisholme that would allow direct running from Bare Lane towards Heysham without the need for reversal at Promenade, which would have been closed, and Euston Road would have re-opened as the terminus for the branch services from Lancaster and Leeds.  However, local opposition to the new curve (which required the demolition of property along its route) saw the scheme dropped and the original plans proceeded with.

Passenger services on the ex-Midland line through Green Ayre were duly withdrawn on and from 3 January 1966, along with most local trains to and from Heysham (though the boat trains from Manchester and London continued) and the overhead wires switched off.  Thereafter only the DMU-worked local shuttle to Lancaster via Bare Lane served the station, along with the re-routed services to and from Leeds via Carnforth and the few remaining summer excursions. Goods traffic continued for a further year on the Midland route, but in June 1967 it was closed completely between Morecambe and Wennington and subsequently dismantled.  The overhead wires were removed from the Heysham branch at the same time. Ironically, a mere seven years after dismantling took place, what is now known as the West Coast Main Line from  through Lancaster Castle station and onwards to Glasgow was electrified.

Promenade station survived the Beeching Axe, but by the late 1980s tourism in Morecambe was rapidly declining.  Traffic levels were significantly lower than they had been at their peak 30 years before, but the four platform, fully signalled, layout had remained largely unaltered and was far too large for the modest service (1-2 trains per hour) in operation. The local authority was keen to regenerate and redevelop the sea-front area surrounding the station and the adjacent Midland Hotel, so in 1993 the decision was taken to close Promenade Station and replace it with a new station situated slightly further inland and closer to the town centre.  A final commemorative railtour visited the station the evening before its official closure on 7 February 1994.

Stationmasters

W. Musgrave 1907  -  1925 (transferred from Northumberland Street)
James Henry Devanny 1925 - 1929 (formerly station master at Barnoldswick)
J.J. Davies 1929 - 1940 (formerly station master at South Wigston, afterwards station master at Low Moor, Bradford)
R. Little from 1940 
W.A. Bell from 1943  (formerly station master at Shipley)

After closure 

The station building remains intact. It became an entertainment venue in 1997 when the pub-cum-restaurant "The Platform" was opened, as well as the Platform Arts Centre and the Morecambe Tourist Information Centre has been based in the station since 1992. The station building has been sympathetically restored to its original Midland Railway condition and has won two design awards - the "Ian Allan National Railway Heritage Award" in 1999 (Highly Commended) and an "Access for All Design Award" in 1998. A special concert was held at the station on 24 March 2007 to celebrate its 100th anniversary with Lancaster's Mayor, Councillor Janie Kirkman, giving a speech, followed by a concert from Brian Lancaster.  The old platforms, sidings and approach line trackbed were cleared soon after closure as part of the redevelopment plans. The town's Indoor Market Hall now occupies part of the site along with a Morrisons supermarket, and the rest is used as an access road to the new station and for car parking.

Image gallery

References

Disused railway stations in Lancaster
Railway stations in Great Britain opened in 1907
Railway stations in Great Britain closed in 1994
Repurposed railway stations in Europe
Former Midland Railway stations
Buildings and structures in Morecambe
Grade II listed buildings in Lancashire